The 2020–21 Greek A2 Basket League is the 35th season of the Greek A2 Basket League, the second-tier level professional club basketball league in Greece. The league is organized by the Hellenic Basketball Federation. It is the sixth season with the participation of 16 teams.

Teams

Regular season

Promotion Playoffs

See also
2020–21 Greek Basketball Super Cup
2020–21 Greek Basketball Cup
2020–21 Greek Basket League (1st tier)

References

External links
Greek A2 Basketball League
Hellenic Basketball Federation 

Greek A2 Basket League
Greek
2020–21 in Greek basketball